Elena Gemo (born 17 March 1987, in Padua) is an Italian swimmer. Height 180 cm, weight  69 kg.

Biography
Gemo qualified for her first Olympic appearance in London 2012. At the 2012 European Aquatics Championships, despite having swum the 7th time in the heat, was not admitted to the semifinals, because each nation could only have a maximum of two athletes in the semifinals and three Italian athletes had qualified.

She is the Italian record holder in the 50-metre-long course and 50 and 100 meter short course backstroke.

Achievements

See also
 Italy at the 2012 Summer Olympics - Swimming
 List of Mediterranean Games records in swimming

References

External links
 Swimmer profile at Federnuoto website
 
 
 

1987 births
Living people
Italian female butterfly swimmers
Italian female backstroke swimmers
Olympic swimmers of Italy
Swimmers at the 2012 Summer Olympics
Mediterranean Games gold medalists for Italy
Swimmers at the 2009 Mediterranean Games
Swimmers at the 2013 Mediterranean Games
Swimmers at the 2018 Mediterranean Games
Universiade medalists in swimming
Mediterranean Games medalists in swimming
Universiade silver medalists for Italy
Medalists at the 2009 Summer Universiade
Medalists at the 2013 Summer Universiade
20th-century Italian women
21st-century Italian women